The Bohemian Club is a club founded in 1899 that was frequented by Chicago's Czech elite, as well as the visiting elite from Czechoslovakia.  The club was used as a place to share Czech culture, drama, music and literature.

It was visited by numerous well-known people of Bohemian descent, such as Anton Cermak, Rudolf Friml, George Halas and Otto Kerner Jr.  It also served as host to Tomáš Garrigue Masaryk, the founder and first President of Czechoslovakia. It is active in the west suburbs of Chicago to this day.

References

External links
 Bohemian Lawyers Association - About

1899 establishments in Illinois
Clubs and societies in the United States
Czech-American culture in Chicago
Czech-American history
History of Chicago